A Cry of Players  is a drama by William Gibson, first performed in 1968, that portrays the young adult life of William Shakespeare. The title comes from Hamlet, spoken by the aforementioned, Act 3, Scene 2: "Would not this, sir, and a forest of feathers-- if the rest of my fortunes turn Turk with me--with two provincial roses on my razed shoes, get me a fellowship in a cry of players, sir?"

Productions
The original production opened on July 24, 1968 at the Berkshire Theatre Festival in  Stockbridge, Massachusetts. The show was directed by Gene Frankel. 

The show transferred to Broadway to the  Repertory Theatre, Lincoln Center and premiered on November 14, 1968. The crew was made up by set design David Hays, costume design Patricia Quinn Stewart, and lighting design John Gleason. Frankel would also direct. Understudies were Ruth Attaway (Meg), Frank Bayer (Arthur), James Cook (Kemp), Leslie Graves (Susanna), Douglas Hayle (Heming), Robert Levine (Richards, Gilbert, Berry), Marilyn Lightstone (Anne), Robert Molock (Pope), William Myers (Hodges, Roche, Old John), Robert Phalen (Will), Robert Stattel (Sandells), and Barbette Tweed (Jenny). The show played in repertoire with William Shakespeare's King Lear.

Original production casts

Plot
The plot is a fictionalized or dramatized version of William Shakespeare's young adult life.

Reception
Clive Barnes, the theatre critic for the New York Times, gave a mixed review, stating "'A Cry Of Players' and a clique of cliches -- there was much that was wrong with William Gibson's new play given by the Lincoln Center Repertory Company at the Vivian Beaumont Theater last night, but there was also much that was right."

References

1968 plays
Broadway plays
Cultural depictions of William Shakespeare
Plays based on real people
Plays set in England
Plays set in the 16th century